Noblella carrascoicola is a species of frog in the family Strabomantidae. It is endemic to the north-eastern Andean slopes of Bolivia, at least between the Cochabamba and La Paz Departments. Its natural habitats are very humid cloud forest and Yungas forest. At day, they can be found in leaf-litter on the forest floor, or occasionally, epiphytic bromeliads. There are no known threats to this abundant species.

References

carrascoicola
Amphibians of the Andes
Amphibians of Bolivia
Endemic fauna of Bolivia
Taxonomy articles created by Polbot
Amphibians described in 1998